Melvin Anderson Ely (born May 2, 1978) is an American former professional basketball player who used to be an assistant coach for the Canton Charge of the NBA G League.

A 6'10", power forward–center from Fresno State, Ely was drafted by the Los Angeles Clippers in the first round (12th overall pick) of the 2002 NBA draft. At Fresno State, he enjoyed a prolific career under the coaching of Jerry Tarkanian.

High school career
While attending Harvey Thornton High School, Ely earned All-American honors from McDonald's and Parade.  As a senior in 1997, he averaged 15.5 points per game, 9.3 rebounds per game and 5.2 blocked shots per game during the regular season and was named the Chicago Sun-Times player of the year and first team all-state.  Ely led his Wildcats to a second-place finish in 1995 and 1996 and third-place in 1997.  During Ely's 3 years as a starter, Thornton Township posted a combined record of 93 wins and 4 losses, including marks of 32–1 in 1997, 31–1 in 1996 and 30–2 in 1995.

In 2007, Ely was voted one of the "100 Legends of the IHSA Boys Basketball Tournament", recognizing his superior performance in his appearances in the tournament.

College career
Under the guidance of coach Jerry Tarkanian at Fresno State, Ely led the Bulldogs to two NCAA tournament appearances in 2000 and 2001. He also won the WAC Player of the Year award in two consecutive seasons in 2001 and 2002.

Professional career
After two seasons in Los Angeles with limited playing time, Ely was traded by the Clippers along with teammate Eddie House on July 14, 2004, to the Charlotte Bobcats for two second-round draft picks in 2005 and 2006. During the 2004–05 and 2005–06 seasons, Ely rejuvenated his career as a prominent reserve role player. On October 2, 2006, he rejected offers from the Golden State Warriors and Phoenix Suns to sign a one-year, $3 million contract to remain with the Bobcats.

On February 13, 2007, he was traded to the San Antonio Spurs in exchange for forward Eric Williams and a second-round draft pick in 2009. He played only 6 games for the Spurs, averaging 3.2 points and 2.3 rebounds per game. He did not play for the Spurs in the playoffs yet he still won the championship ring.

In the 2007 off-season, Ely signed with the New Orleans Hornets. It was formally announced on September 12 that it was a two-year contract.

In 2012, Ely signed with the Brujos de Guayama of Puerto Rico.

On October 27, 2012, Ely signed with the Dallas Mavericks along with guard Chris Douglas-Roberts. He and Douglas-Roberts were waived the next day. On November 1, 2012, he was acquired by the Texas Legends of the NBA D-League.

In September 2013, Ely signed with the Memphis Grizzlies. However, he was waived on October 26.

In November 2013, he was re-acquired by the Texas Legends. On February 3, 2014, Ely was named to the Prospects All-Star roster for the 2014 NBA D-League All-Star Game. On April 14, 2014, he signed with the New Orleans Pelicans for the rest of the season.

Ely's final NBA game was April 16, 2014 in a 105 - 100 win over the Houston Rockets where he recorded 4 points and 1 block.

On July 15, 2014, he was traded to the Washington Wizards. On July 30, 2014, he was waived by the Wizards.

In September 2014, Ely signed a one-year deal with the Gunma Crane Thunders of the Japanese bj league.

On November 2, 2017, Ely was Inducted in to the Fresno Athletic Hall of Fame with some of his 2005 Fresno State teammates in attendance.

Coaching career

On August 23, 2015, Ely was hired to join Martin Knezevic's staff in the newly-formed AmeriLeague in Las Vegas (league folded prior to the season).

On September 27, 2016, he was hired by the Canton Charge to serve as an assistant coach.

NBA career statistics

Regular season

|-
| align="left" | 
| align="left" | L.A. Clippers
| 52 || 7 || 15.4 || .495 || .000 || .703 || 3.3 || .3 || .2 || .6 || 4.5
|-
| align="left" | 
| align="left" | L.A. Clippers
| 42 || 2 || 12.1 || .431 || .000 || .595 || 2.4 || .5 || .2 || .4 || 3.7
|-
| align="left" | 
| align="left" | Charlotte
| 79 || 17 || 20.9 || .432 || .000 || .575 || 4.1 || 1.0 || .4 || .9 || 7.3
|-
| align="left" | 
| align="left" | Charlotte
| 57 || 22 || 23.6 || .508 || .000 || .667 || 4.9 || 1.3 || .5 || .8 || 9.8
|-
| align="left" | 
| align="left" | Charlotte
| 24 || 0 || 10.2 || .383 || .000 || .686 || 1.6 || .6 || .1 || .3 || 2.9
|-
| style="text-align:left; background:#afe6ba;" | †
| align="left" | San Antonio
| 6 || 0 || 10.8 || .300 || .000 || .583 || 2.3 || .7 || .7 || .3 || 3.2
|-
| align="left" | 
| align="left" | New Orleans
| 52 || 1 || 11.9 || .472 || .000 || .552 || 2.8 || .4 || .1 || .3 || 3.9
|-
| align="left" | 
| align="left" | New Orleans
| 31 || 4 || 12.0 || .389 || .000 || .639 || 2.1 || .6 || .1 || .3 || 3.1
|-
| align="left" | 
| align="left" | Denver
| 30 || 2 || 12.2 || .549 || .000 || .619 || 2.5 || .5 || .1 || .4 || 2.3
|-
| align="left" | 
| align="left" | New Orleans
| 2 || 0 || 13.5 || .500 || .000 || .000 || .5 || .0 || .0 || .5 || 3.0
|- class="sortbottom"
| style="text-align:center;" colspan="2"| Career
| 375 || 55 || 16.0 || .460 || .000 || .625 || 3.2 || .7 || .3 || .6 || 5.3

Playoffs 

|-
| align="left" | 2008
| align="left" | New Orleans
| 7 || 0 || 8.4 || .267 || .000 || .700 || 1.6 || .1 || .0 || .0 || 2.1
|- class="sortbottom"
| style="text-align:center;" colspan="2"| Career
| 7 || 0 || 8.4 || .267 || .000 || .700 || 1.6 || .1 || .0 || .0 || 2.1

References

External links
NBA.com Profile

1978 births
Living people
African-American basketball players
American expatriate basketball people in Japan
American men's basketball players
Basketball coaches from Illinois
Basketball players from Illinois
Canton Charge coaches
Centers (basketball)
Charlotte Bobcats players
Denver Nuggets players
Fresno State Bulldogs men's basketball players
Gunma Crane Thunders players
Los Angeles Clippers draft picks
Los Angeles Clippers players
McDonald's High School All-Americans
New Orleans Hornets players
New Orleans Pelicans players
Parade High School All-Americans (boys' basketball)
People from Harvey, Illinois
Power forwards (basketball)
San Antonio Spurs players
Sportspeople from Cook County, Illinois
Texas Legends players
Universiade bronze medalists for the United States
Universiade medalists in basketball
Medalists at the 2001 Summer Universiade
21st-century African-American sportspeople
20th-century African-American sportspeople